The General Staff of the Armed Forces of Kyrgyz Republic (Kyrgyz Respublikasynyn Kuralduu Küxhtörünün Bashky shtabynyn) is the military staff of the Armed Forces of the Kyrgyz Republic.

The Chief of the General Staff is appointed by the President of Kyrgyzstan, who is the supreme commander-in-chief of the armed forces. The current Chief of the General Staff is Major General Erlis Terdikbayev. From 2014-2021, the Chief of the General Staff was the paramount leader of the armed forces, just second to the commander in chief. It is currently composed of the commanders of the Kyrgyz Army, Kyrgyz Air Force, Kyrgyzstan Frontier Force, and the Kyrgyz National Guard. The headquarters of the General Staff is located on 26 Yakov Logvinenko Street, in Bishkek, Kyrgyzstan.

General information 
The Chief of the General Staff is appointed directly by the President of Kyrgyzstan, who is also commander in chief of the country's military. He/she holds the rank of Major general (Генерал майор). The general staff is the chief organizing and executive body in the armed force responsible for maintaining its combat readiness. From 2014-2021, it was higher in precedence to the State Committee for Defense Affairs, which was the equivalent to Kyrgyzstan's defense ministry. In February 2014, the General Staff was expanded to have complete control and authority over the entire military, with the state defense committee playing a smaller, sometimes ceremonial role. This was reverted in February 2021, with the General Staff presently serving as an administrative position under the Ministry of Defense.

Current leaders 
 Chief of the General Staff – Major General Erlis Terdikbayev
 Commander of the Army – Colonel Almazbek Karasartov
 Commander of the Air Force – Colonel Kylychbek Aidaraliev
 Commander of the State Border Guard Service – Colonel Ularbek Sharesheev
 Commander of the National Guard – Colonel Talantbek Ergeshov

List of Chiefs of the General Staff

Awards of the General Staff 
Military personnel of the Armed Forces can be awarded with General Staff awards, as well as military personnel of foreign states and citizens of the Kyrgyz Republic. Currently, the General Staff of the Armed Forces of the Kyrgyz Republic has the following departmental awards:

 Medal "For military merits"
 Medal "For loyalty to duty"

See also 
 Chief of the General Staff
 Band of the General Staff of the Armed Forces of Kyrgyzstan

External links 
 Official Youtube Channel
 Official Website

References 

General Staff (Kyrgyzstan)
Kyrgyzstan